The women's 200 metre breaststroke competition of the swimming events at the 1971 Pan American Games took place on 9 August. The last Pan American Games champion was Catie Ball of US.

This race consisted of four lengths of the pool, all in breaststroke.

Results
All times are in minutes and seconds.

Heats

Final 
The final was held on August 9.

References

Swimming at the 1971 Pan American Games
Pan